The Minister for Drugs Policy is a junior ministerial post in the Scottish Government. As a result, the minister does not attend the Scottish Cabinet but reports directly to the First Minister of Scotland. The current Minister for Drugs Policy is Angela Constance, who was appointed in December 2020.

History 
The office was created in December 2020 by First Minister Nicola Sturgeon following the resignation of Minister for Public Health, Joe FitzPatrick. His resignation was triggered by the figures released that showed Scotland again had the worst drug death rate in Europe. Sturgeon stated that her government had taken their "eye off the ball on drug deaths" and appointed Angela Constance to take on the new dedicated role as Minister for Drugs Policy.

Overview

Responsibilities 
The specific responsibilities of the minister are:
Tackling and reducing the harm of drug misuse
Supporting the rehabilitation and recovery of those living with drug addiction
Reducing the number of deaths from drugs

List of office holders

References

External links 
Minister for Drugs Policy on Scottish Government website

Scottish Parliament
Drugs Policy
Drugs in Scotland